Talbutal (Lotusate) is a barbiturate with a short to intermediate duration of action. It is a structural isomer of butalbital. Talbutal is a schedule III drug in the U.S.

Pharmacology
Talbutal is a short to intermediate-acting barbiturate. Barbiturates act as nonselective depressants of the central nervous system (CNS), capable of producing all levels of CNS mood alteration from excitation to mild sedation, hypnosis, and deep coma. In sufficiently high therapeutic doses, barbiturates induce anesthesia.

Mechanism of action
Talbutal binds at a distinct binding site associated with a Cl− ionophore at the GABAA receptor, increasing the duration of time for which the Cl− ionophore is open. The post-synaptic inhibitory effect of GABA in the thalamus is, therefore, prolonged.

Toxicity
Symptoms of acute barbiturate poisoning include drowsiness, confusion, coma, respiratory depression, hypotension, and shock.

References

Barbiturates
GABAA receptor positive allosteric modulators
Allyl compounds